The First Battle of Stamford occurred when West Saxon Ealdorman Aethelnoth invaded the town in the summer of 894, but it was not besieged and Danish rule was unaffected.

See also
Battle of Stamford (918)

References

890s conflicts
Battles involving Wessex
Battles involving the Vikings
Battles involving the Anglo-Saxons
894
9th century in England